The siege of Masulipatam was a British siege of the French-held town of Masulipatam in India during the Seven Years' War. The siege commenced on 6 March 1759 and lasted until the storming of the town by the British on the 7 April. The British were commanded by Colonel Francis Forde while the French defenders were under the command of Conflans.

The British taking of the town helped relieve the Siege of Madras.

See also
 Great Britain in the Seven Years' War

Bibliography
 Harvey, Robert. Clive: The Life and Death of a British Emperor. Sceptre, 1999.
 Henty, George Alfred. With Clive in India. Or, The Beginnings of an Empire.
 Keay, John. The Honourable Company: A History of the English East India Company. Harper Collins, 1993
 McLynn, Frank. 1759: The Year Britain Became Master of the World. Pimlico, 2005.

Masulipatam
Masulipatam
Masulipatam
Masulipatam
1759 in India
Third Carnatic War